Reunion in Reno is a 1951 American comedy film directed by Kurt Neumann and starring Mark Stevens, Peggy Dow and Gigi Perreau. The screenplay concerns a girl who hires an attorney to get her a divorce from her parents. The film's sets were designed by the art directors Bernard Herzbrun and Nathan Juran.

Plot
A nine-year-old girl, Maggie Linaker, gets off a bus in Reno, Nevada and goes to find Norman Drake, a divorce lawyer there. Norman has just wrapped up a divorce case, after which Laura Carson, a stenographer in Judge Kneeland's court, scolds the lawyer for accepting payments over couples' breakups, rather than trying to steer them toward reconciliation.

Maggie explains that she'd like to divorce her parents. She offers the lawyer all the money she has, $3.27. Norman accepts. Neither he nor Laura, however, can persuade the little girl to give them her parents' names or how they can be found. She just wants to divorce them.

A clothing label mentioning a California town results in Norman finding the parents, Doris and Frederick Linaker, who are shocked to hear what their daughter has done. Maggie was supposed to be on a bus trip to a Nevada summer camp. It turns out Doris is pregnant and that she is not the birth mother of Maggie, who had been an abandoned child.

A mock trial is held in Judge Kneeland's court, at which Maggie explains that she overheard her parents say they won't be able to afford to raise two children. Doris reassures her that it was merely a worry, not a reason to leave. They return home, whereupon Norman and Laura begin to think they might like to have a try at this parenthood thing.

Cast
 Mark Stevens as Norman Drake  
 Peggy Dow as Laura Carson  
 Gigi Perreau as Margaret 'Maggie' Angeline Linaker 
 Frances Dee as Mrs. Doris Linaker  
 Leif Erickson as B. Frederick Linaker  
 Ray Collins as Judge Thomas Kneeland  
 Fay Baker as Miss Pearson  
 Myrna Dell as Mrs. Virginia Mason  
 Dick Wessel as Taxi Driver  
 Sid Tomack as Serge Field  
 Stuart Morgan Dancers as Dancing Ensemble

References

Bibliography
 Quinlan, David. The Film Lover's Companion: An A to Z Guide to 2,000 Stars and the Movies They Made. Carol Publishing Group, 1997.

External links
 

1951 films
1951 comedy films
American comedy films
Films directed by Kurt Neumann
Films set in Nevada
Universal Pictures films
American black-and-white films
1950s English-language films
1950s American films